Jermaine Taylor may refer to:

 Jermaine Taylor (basketball) (born 1986), American basketball player
 Jermain Taylor (born 1978), American boxer
 Jermaine Taylor (footballer) (born 1985), Jamaican footballer

See also
Jerry Taylor (disambiguation)